Paratettix rugosus, known generally as the rough-back pygmy grasshopper or rough-backed grouse locust, is a species of pygmy grasshopper in the family Tetrigidae. It is found in North America.

References

Tetrigidae
Articles created by Qbugbot
Insects described in 1863